Domingo Miotti (born 22 May 1996) is an Argentina international rugby union player. His regular playing position is fly-half.

Rugby Union career

Professional career

Miotti played for the Jaguares.

Miotti was then signed for Western Force.

On 10 March 2021 it was announced that Miotti had signed for Glasgow Warriors for the 2021–22 season. Miotti said of the move:
I’m very excited to join Glasgow. They are a great club and playing in the Guinness PRO14 will be a new experience for me that I’m really looking forward to. I’ve watched some of Glasgow’s games and they play a fun attacking style of rugby that I’m excited to be a part of.

Miotti made his competitive debut for Glasgow on 4 December 2021 in their match against the Dragons at Scotstoun Stadium on 4 December 2021. He became Glasgow Warrior No. 339.

International career

Miotti has played for Argentina U20, Argentina 'A' and Argentina 7s.

Miotti has played for the Argentina international side.

References

External links

Jaguares (Super Rugby) players
Rugby union fly-halves
Argentine rugby union players
1996 births
Living people
Tucumán Rugby Club players
Argentina international rugby union players
Western Force players
Glasgow Warriors players
Sportspeople from San Miguel de Tucumán